"Te He Echado de Menos" is a song by Spanish singer Pablo Alborán. It was released as the second single from his live album En Acústico on 28 February 2012 as a digital download in Spain.

Track listing

Chart performance

Release history

References

2012 singles
Pablo Alborán songs
2011 songs
EMI Latin singles
Songs written by Pablo Alborán